Marika Pertakhiya (born 15 December 1992) is a Russian freestyle skier. She  competed at the 2014 Winter Olympics in Sochi, where she qualified for the moguls finals.

References

1992 births
Living people
Freestyle skiers at the 2014 Winter Olympics
Freestyle skiers at the 2018 Winter Olympics
Russian female freestyle skiers
Olympic freestyle skiers of Russia
Universiade medalists in freestyle skiing
Universiade silver medalists for Russia
Competitors at the 2015 Winter Universiade
20th-century Russian women
21st-century Russian women